The  is an underbone style motorcycle produced by Suzuki from 1974 to the early 1980s. It was very similar in design to the Suzuki FR80

It is started by a kick start mechanism which turns over the engine. Despite being under 50cc the contemporary UK classifications designated it as a motorcycle, rather than a moped, which would have required the fitting of pedal drive.

It had a small 6V (six volt) battery fitted and an ignition switch to provide easy starting and for constant and even power to the lights and horn.  

Like the FR80, the engine drives a 3-speed semi-automatic gearbox, with a heel-and-toe gear shift. 

In the early 1970s Suzuki started to import the FR50, followed by the introduction of the FR 50K an improved
version in 1974, then it was discontinued in August 1975.  Production didn't resume until February 1981 in the form of an even further improved version, the FR50 X. 

The FR80 replaced the FR70 in the summer of 1976.

References
Footnotes

Sources
Information obtained from the
 Haynes FR50, 70, and 80 OWNERS WORKSHOP MANUAL 1974–1983
 Suzuki Owner's Manual FR50

FR50
Motorcycles introduced in 1974
Two-stroke motorcycles